"Everybody Breaks a Glass" is a song by Canadian recording artist Lights. It was released on July 19, 2011 as a promotional single from her second studio album Siberia (2011). It features music by electronica band Holy Fuck and guest vocals from Canadian rapper Shad.

Background
The song features music from the Electronica band, Holy Fuck and vocals from Shad. Upon its release, Lights stated her nervousness over the new song.

Music video
On July 22, a lyric video was released by Lights. The video was envisioned and created solely by Lights.

Track listing

Charts
The song has debuted at #15 on the iTunes Canadian Songs chart. For the issue date of August 6, 2011, the song debuted in the 79th position of the Canadian Hot 100.

References

Lights (musician) songs
2011 singles
2011 songs
Songs written by Lights (musician)